OGLE-2006-BLG-109Lc is an extrasolar planet approximately 4,920 light-years away in the constellation of Sagittarius.  The planet was detected orbiting the star OGLE-2006-BLG-109L in 2008 by a research team using Microlensing. The host star is about 50% the mass of the Sun and the planet is about 90% the mass of Saturn.

See also 
 Optical Gravitational Lensing Experiment or OGLE
 47 Ursae Majoris b
 OGLE-2005-BLG-390Lb
 OGLE-2006-BLG-109Lb

References

External links 
 
 
 
 

Sagittarius (constellation)
Exoplanets discovered in 2008
Giant planets
Exoplanets detected by microlensing